Cleveland Bailey (born 15 March 1918) was a Jamaican cricketer. He played in five first-class matches for the Jamaican cricket team from 1946 to 1948.

See also
 List of Jamaican representative cricketers

References

External links
 

1918 births
Year of death missing
Jamaican cricketers
Jamaica cricketers
People from Saint Catherine Parish